Planet Cancer was an online community for young adults with cancer.  The organization approached the disease with a sense of humor and included a "cancertainment" section with amusing essays including "Top 10 Signs You've Joined a Cheap HMO."1

Planet Cancer was founded by Heidi Schultz Adams, a young adult cancer survivor who was diagnosed at 26 with Ewing's sarcoma, to help young adult cancer patients overcome isolation and connect with other cancer survivors in their age group.²  It was acquired by the Lance Armstrong Foundation in 2009.

References 
1 Szabo, Liz. "Laughing in the Face of Cancer." USA Today. 2006-05-23. Retrieved 2007-09-13.

² Schultz Adams, Heidi. "Young Adults Overcome Isolation by Creating Cancer Communities." Curextra. 2007-March. Retrieved 2007-09-13.

External links
 http://www.planetcancer.org
 http://myplanet.planetcancer.org/
 https://twitter.com/planetcancer
 http://www.planetcancer.org/blog/heidiblog.html

American medical websites
American social networking websites